Lactuca, commonly known as lettuce, is a genus of flowering plants in the family Asteraceae. The genus includes at least 50 species, distributed worldwide, but mainly in temperate Eurasia.

Its best-known representative is the garden lettuce (Lactuca sativa), with its many varieties. "Wild lettuce" commonly refers to the wild-growing relatives of common garden lettuce. Many species are common weeds. Lactuca species are diverse and take a wide variety of forms. They are annuals, biennials, perennials, or shrubs. Their flower heads have yellow, blue, or white ray florets. Some species are bitter-tasting.

Most wild lettuces are xerophytes, adapted to dry habitat types. Some occur in more moist areas, such as the mountains of central Africa.

Diversity

 

There are different concepts of the species within Lactuca. It is not clear how many distinct species are known, and estimates vary from 50 to 75 so far.

Species include:

Lactuca acanthifolia (Crete, Turkey)
Lactuca aculeata (Asia Minor)
Lactuca acuminata 
Lactuca adenophora 
Lactuca alpestris (Crete)
Lactuca alpina (syn. Cicerbita alpina) (Europe) - alpine sow-thistle, alpine blue-sow-thistle, tall blue lettuce
Lactuca altaica (Eurasia)
Lactuca attenuata (Africa)
Lactuca aurea (Europe)
Lactuca azerbaijanica (Iran)
Lactuca biennis (North America) – tall blue lettuce, blue wood lettuce
Lactuca calophylla (Africa)
Lactuca canadensis (North America) – Canada wild lettuce, tall lettuce
Lactuca corymbosa (Congo)
Lactuca crambifolia (Turkestan)
Lactuca cyprica (Cyprus) - Cyprus lettuce
Lactuca deltoidea 
Lactuca dissecta (Asia)
Lactuca dolichophylla (Asia)
Lactuca dregeana (South Africa) – melkdissel, slaaidissel
Lactuca dumicola
Lactuca erostrata (Pakistan)
Lactuca fenzlii
Lactuca floridana (North America) – Florida lettuce, woodland lettuce
Lactuca georgica (Asia)
Lactuca glaucifolia (Asia)
Lactuca graciliflora (Asia)
Lactuca graminifolia (Americas) – grassleaf lettuce
Lactuca haimanniana
Lactuca henryi
Lactuca hirsuta (North America) – downy lettuce, hairy lettuce
Lactuca hispida 
Lactuca homblei (Zaire, Zambia)
Lactuca imbricata (Africa)
Lactuca indica (Asia) - Indian lettuce
Lactuca inermis (Africa, Arabian Peninsula)
Lactuca intricata (Albania, Greece, Turkey)
Lactuca jamaicensis (Jamaica)
Lactuca kanitziana
Lactuca kochiana
Lactuca lasiorhiza (Africa)
Lactuca ludoviciana (North America) – biannual lettuce
Lactuca macrophylla
Lactuca mira
Lactuca muralis
Lactuca mwinilungensis (Zaire, Zambia)
Lactuca nana (Africa)
Lactuca orientalis (Asia, Egypt)
Lactuca palmensis (Canary Islands)
Lactuca paradoxa
Lactuca parishii
Lactuca perennis (Europe) – blue lettuce, mountain lettuce
Lactuca persica 
Lactuca petrensis 
Lactuca quercina (Eurasia)
Lactuca racemosa
Lactuca raddeana (Asia)
Lactuca rechingeriana 
Lactuca rosularis (Iran, Turkmenistan)
Lactuca saligna (Eurasia) – willow lettuce, least lettuce, narrow-leaf lettuce
Lactuca sativa – lettuce, garden lettuce
Lactuca scarioloides (western Asia)
Lactuca schulzeana (Angola, Cameroon, Zaire)
Lactuca schweinfurthii (Africa)
Lactuca serriola (Africa, Asia, Europe) – prickly lettuce, compassplant, scarole, milk thistle
Lactuca setosa (Africa)
Lactuca sibirica (Eurasia)
Lactuca singularis (Spain)
Lactuca songeensis
Lactuca spinidens (Tajikistan, Turkmenistan)
Lactuca stebbinsii (Angola)
Lactuca takhtadzhianii (Armenia)
Lactuca tatarica (Northern Hemisphere) – blue lettuce
Lactuca tenerrima (southern Europe, Morocco)
Lactuca tetrantha (Cyprus)
Lactuca tinctociliata
Lactuca triangulata (Asia)
Lactuca triquetra
Lactuca tuberosa (Eurasia)
Lactuca ugandensis
Lactuca undulata (Asia)
Lactuca viminea (Africa, Asia, Europe) – pliant lettuce
Lactuca virosa (Europe, northern Africa) – bitter lettuce, great lettuce
Lactuca watsoniana (Azores)
Lactuca winkleri (Tajikistan)

Ecology
Lactuca species are used as food plants by the larvae of many Lepidoptera species.

Etymology
'Lactuca' is derived from Latin and means 'having milky sap'. 'Lactuca' and 'lactic' (of or relating to milk) have the same root word, 'lactis'.

References

External links
Jepson Manual Treatment

 
Asteraceae genera